Mischievous Miss is a 1930 German silent comedy film directed by Erich Schönfelder and starring Julius Falkenstein, Dina Gralla and Albert Paulig. It was made at the Staaken Studios in Berlin, with some scenes shot on location in Portugal. The film's sets were designed by the art director Heinrich Richter. It premiered at Berlin's Marmorhaus cinema.

Cast
Julius Falkenstein as Baron Eggloffsburg
Dina Gralla as Daisy, his daughter
Albert Paulig as Uncle Egon
Josefine Dora as Aunt Josefine
Wolfgang von Schwindt as Uncle Adolf
Emmy Wyda as Aunt Agathe
Arthur Duarte as Rittmeister Frank Neuhaus
Robin Irvine as Harry Spring, his friend
Siegfried Berisch as stable master Arisch
Max Nosseck as Bob, ein Stalljunge
Ernst Behmer as Pächter Schreck
Gustl Herrmann as his wife
Else Reval as Kathi Ferkl, Gutsmamsell

References

External links

Films of the Weimar Republic
1930 comedy films
German silent feature films
German comedy films
Films directed by Erich Schönfelder
Films shot in Portugal
Films shot at Staaken Studios
German black-and-white films
Silent comedy films
1930s German films